Alexander Valerievich Radulov (born 5 July 1986) is a Russian professional ice hockey player for Ak Bars Kazan of the Kontinental Hockey League (KHL). He had previously had two separate stints with the Nashville Predators, the NHL team which had drafted him, as well one season with the Montreal Canadiens, five seasons with the Dallas Stars, and eight seasons in the Kontinental Hockey League (KHL), split evenly between Salavat Yulaev Ufa and CSKA Moscow.

Radulov is a two-time World Champion (2008 and 2009) with Russia; a 2011 Gagarin Cup champion with Salavat Yulaev Ufa; and a 2006 Memorial Cup champion with the Quebec Major Junior Hockey League (QMJHL)'s Quebec Remparts. He won the Golden Stick Award (KHL MVP) on four occasions. Radulov ranks second in all-time KHL scoring with 427 points, behind only Sergei Mozyakin. He is of mixed Russian and Gagauz ethnicity. Alexander is the brother of Igor Radulov.

Playing career

Junior career
Radulov began his North American career in 2004–05, selected at the 2004 Canadian Hockey League Import player draft by the Quebec Remparts of the Quebec Major Junior Hockey League (QMJHL). That year, he finished third in scoring for his team, with 75 points in 65 games, behind Josh Hennessy and Karl Gagné.

The following year, Radulov became one of the most exciting and dominant players to play in the QMJHL. In the first half of the season, he and rookie Angelo Esposito formed one of the most explosive duos in the league. He became equally renowned for skating in front of the opposing team's bench and twirling his stick around and banging the handle on the ice, as if to put a sword into a sheath, after scoring a goal, something that angered opposing players but captivated and inspired his head coach, Patrick Roy.

On 28 October 2005, Radulov set a new franchise record with six goals against the Drummondville Voltigeurs. He added an assist in the eventual 11–3 win. That night, Radulov tied the Remparts team's record with Eric Chouinard for most points in a single game, with seven. Later, on 19 March 2006, in a game against the 2005 Memorial Cup second-place finishing Rimouski Océanic, for whom his teammates Cédrick Desjardins and Michal Sersen played for in 2004–05, Radulov wrote history in the Québec Colisée by scoring an unprecedented 7 goals and 4 assists for 11 points, breaking both records for most goals and points in a single game for the Remparts, in a lopsided 16–3 victory.

Radulov owns the Remparts record for the most consecutive point streak games with 50, passing the 28-game mark established by Eric Chouinard in the 1999–2000 season. Radulov is ranked second all-time with that sequence in the QMJHL, only behind Mario Lemieux, with 62.

Radulov finished as the scoring leader for the QMJHL and the CHL in 2005–06 with 152 points (61 goals and 91 assists). He currently owns the record for the most points in a single season for the Remparts, surpassing the mark of 120 set by Simon Gagné in 1998–99. Radulov also owns the record for the most goals and assists in a season as a Rempart. He passed the mark of 57 goals set by Eric Chouinard and the mark of 75 assists set by Wes Scanzano, both in 1999–2000. He also tied with Pavel Rosa for the most points by a QMJHL European player in a single season. His 61 goals were second-highest in the QMJHL for the 2005–06 season; Maxime Boisclair of the Chicoutimi Saguenéens was first, with 70.

In the 2006 QMJHL playoffs, Radulov scored 55 points (21 goals and 34 assists) and was ranked again as the scoring leader. He registered at least a point in each game. Radulov finished only two points shy of the playoff points record set by Simon Gamache in 2000–01. In the Remparts' semi-final series against the Acadie-Bathurst Titan, he had 19 points in the seven-game series alone. He lost the MVP award, however, to victorious Moncton Wildcats forward Mārtiņš Karsums.

All team records set by Radulov are for the new edition of the Remparts, which began in the 1997–98 season.

Radulov delivered an incredible performance in the Remparts' 2006 Memorial Cup championship game victory over the Moncton Wildcats. In the 6–2 win, he netted two goals and assisted on three more, totaling five points, one point away from tying the all-time record in a Memorial Cup final. He registered nine points (five goals and four assists) in four games and won the Stafford Smythe Memorial Trophy as the tournament MVP.

On 28 November 2007, the Remparts retired Radulov's number 22 jersey.

Nashville Predators
During Radulov's 2005–06 season in the QMJHL, he signed a three-year, entry-level professional contract with the Nashville Predators on 9 January 2006. He would begin his professional career as a member of the Predators' minor league affiliate, the Milwaukee Admirals of the American Hockey League (AHL), the following season. He was selected Player of the Week on 16 October 2006, posting two goals and four assists in only two games.

On 21 October 2006, Radulov made his NHL debut with the Predators against the Vancouver Canucks, logging seven minutes and one minor penalty. He scored his first career NHL goal on his first career shot against the San Jose Sharks on 26 October. Following another reassignment to Milwaukee, Radulov remained on the Nashville roster for the rest of the 2006–07 season after he was recalled on 21 November 2006.

In Game 2 of the first round of the 2007 Stanley Cup playoffs, Radulov was suspended for one game for his hit on San Jose forward Steve Bernier. Bernier was sent into the boards head first and lay motionless on the ice for three minutes, before being helped off by teammates Joe Thornton and Marcel Goc. Bernier, however, did not suffer any serious injury.

Salavat Yulaev Ufa

Transfer dispute
On 11 July 2008, it was announced that although Radulov was still under contract with the Nashville Predators for one more season, he had signed a three-year contract with Salavat Yulaev Ufa of the Kontinental Hockey League (KHL), which would be extended to four years. Radulov had previously notified the Predators organization of his desire to play in Russia, stating that he was being offered better conditions.

Immediately after the announcement, the Predators, NHL and the International Ice Hockey Federation (IIHF) all released statements emphasizing that Radulov's contract obligated him to play for the Predators through the 2008–09 season and that signing with a team in Russia was a direct violation of an agreement made the previous day between the NHL and all international hockey leagues to respect players' existing contracts. After the IIHF ordered that Ufa void Radulov's contract, Ilya Kochevrin, vice-president of the KHL, argued that Radulov was signed on 5 July, before the agreement was made on 10 July. While the contract remained disputed, the IIHF suspended Radulov from international play on 18 July as investigations continued, although the suspension was soon lifted.

Nashville management gave Radulov until 1 September to confirm his intention to remain with the team. They suspended him on 2 September without pay for the 2008–09 season.

Two Continental Cups
In his first year, the 2008–09 season with Salavat Yulaev Ufa, a 22-year-old Radulov would finish third on the team with 48 points in 52 games. The team would win the Continental Cup as regular season champions. In the playoffs, they would bow out in the first round, with Radulov earning two assists in four games.

In his second year, the 2009–10 season, Radulov would lead his team with 63 points in 54 games. The team would win a second straight Continental Cup, but in the playoffs, they would lose in the Eastern Conference Final to eventual champions Ak Bars Kazan in six games. Radulov led the team with 19 points in 16 games.

Radulov won his first Golden Stick Award as KHL regular season MVP, and made the season All-Star team. His 63 points placed him fourth in the league, three points away from league leader Sergei Mozyakin, who had played two more games. Radulov's plus-minus rating of +44 was second best in the league, behind teammate Patrick Thoresen's +45. Radulov finished the season tied second in assists (39) and tied for ninth in goals (24).

Gagarin Cup champion
In his third year, the 2010–11 season, Radulov would lead his team and all of the KHL with 80 points in 54 games. Salavat Yulaev Ufa would finish second in the league, with division rival Avangard Omsk winning the Continental Cup. In the playoffs, the pairing of Radulov and Thoresen would lead the team to a Gagarin Cup, with each of them scoring 18 points apiece over 21 games; each scored 3 goals and added 15 assists.

Radulov won his second Golden Stick Award as KHL regular season MVP and made the All-Star team again. His record-setting 80 points were 14 more than linemate Thoresen's 66 points and 19 more than Roman Červenka's 61 points for Avangard Omsk. Radulov finished the season first in assists, tied for 15th in goals, and tied for first in plus-minus rating (+27).

Final year
At the conclusion of the previous championship winning season, the contract of head coach Vyacheslav Bykov was expiring. At the time, Bykov also served as the head coach of the Russian national team, having held the post for the previous five years. Unfortunately, a poor showing for Russia at the 2011 IIHF World Championship, where the team finished without a medal for the first time under his tenure, prompted Salavat not to renew his contract with the club.

As a result, a number of important players left the club in the off season—Patrick Thoresen, Kirill Koltsov and Dmitri Kalinin all signed with mega club SKA Saint Petersburg. This led to the rehiring of head coach Sergei Mikhalev, who had coached the team in the 2008–09 season to a Continental Cup, with a record of 43–8–0–5. However, he was unable to replicate past results and was fired as head coach after 21 games, posting a result of 9–8–0–4.

This led to a third coach within the calendar year being named to the post: Vener Safin. As the team was struggling, more players were traded away, including Robert Nilsson and Jakub Klepiš, among others. The team would round out the season with a record of 21–10–0–2 and ultimately finish eighth in the league. In the playoffs, they would lose to Ak Bars Kazan in the first round, in six games.

In his final year, the 2011–12 season, Radulov would once again lead his team and all of the KHL, with 63 points in 50 games despite an overturned roster. In the playoffs, he would add six assists in six games. At season's end, Radulov won his third Golden Stick Award as KHL regular season MVP and made the All-Star team for the third time. He finished the season first in assists and tied for second in goals.

Return to Nashville
Following the end of Salavat Yulaev Ufa's 2011–12 season, on 12 March 2012, it was reported that paperwork was being finalized for Radulov to return to Nashville for the balance of the regular season and for the 2012 playoffs. Five days later, Radulov's agent Yuri Nikolaev confirmed Radulov was indeed returning to the NHL for Nashville's 22 March 2012, game against the Pittsburgh Penguins. The day before his return, Radulov was presented his jersey at a press conference, where the Predators announced they had lifted his suspension from the team, finalizing his return. In his return to Nashville, Radulov scored the Predators' only goal in a 5–1 loss to the Penguins. He concluded the 2011–12 regular season with seven points (three goals and four assists) in nine games.

On 1 May 2012, Radulov and Predators teammate Andrei Kostitsyn were spotted at a Scottsdale, Arizona, bar at 5:00 AM the night before Game 2 of their second round playoff series against the Phoenix Coyotes, thus breaking team curfew. Both were subsequently suspended by Predators management for Game 3. Predators general manager David Poile said of the incident, "What they did was unacceptable and the coaches and myself had to come to the plate and do the right thing for the team. It happened. It's really unfortunate. It's selfish behaviour and we'll just have to leave it at that."

On 6 June 2012, the Predators announced that they would not be extending Radulov's contract, thus making him an unrestricted free agent.

CSKA Moscow

On 2 July 2012, Radulov signed a four-year contract with CSKA Moscow of the KHL worth an average annual value of $9.2 million. He would lead the KHL in points or finish runner up, in three of the four seasons of his contract: 2012–13 (second), 2014–15 (first) and 2015–16 (second).

The 2013–14 season would be filled with injuries, and Radulov would miss multiple stretches of games. He would go on to appear in only 34 games, while still putting up 34 points. He would also miss the playoffs, during which CSKA was eliminated in the first round.

In his third year, 2014–15, Radulov led his team to a Continental Cup. In the playoffs, CSKA reached the Conference Final of the Gagarin Cup, losing in Game 7 to the eventual champions SKA Saint Petersburg.

In his fourth and final season, 2015–16, Radulov led CSKA to a second-straight Continental Cup. In the playoffs, they once again met SKA Saint Petersburg in the Conference Final, eliminating them in four-straight games. However, CSKA would then fall short of their ultimate goal and lose Game 7 of the Gagarin Cup Final to champions Metallurg Magnitogorsk.

Montreal Canadiens
On 1 July 2016, Radulov returned to the NHL as a free agent, signing a one-year, $5.75 million contract with the Montreal Canadiens. Radulov assumed a scoring role on the top line of the Canadiens and went on to score 18 goals and 36 assists for 54 points in 76 games played.

Dallas Stars
On July 3, 2017, having been unable to agree to another contract with the Canadiens, Radulov signed with the Dallas Stars to a five-year, $31.25 million contract. With the Stars, Radulov reached the 2020 Stanley Cup Finals losing to the Tampa Bay Lightning (2–4). However, the following seasons were plagued with an injury and a decrease of his point production, posting only 22 points in 71 games in the last year of his contract.

Ak Bars Kazan
On May 31, 2022, his agent announced his return to KHL, signing a two-year contract with Ak Bars Kazan. It was later announced officially by Ak Bars on 14 July 2022.

International play

Radulov has played for Russia since the junior youth level, earning silver medals in the 2005 and 2006 World Junior Championships. He made his full senior men's debut in the 2007 World Championships, claiming a bronze medal before capturing two golds at the 2008 and 2009 World Championships.

At the 2014 Winter Olympics in Sochi, Radulov led Russia in goals (three) and points (six) in five games, though the team lost in the quarter-finals to Finland, ultimately finishing in fifth place.

Personal life
In May 2015, Radulov married rhythmic gymnast Darya Dmitriyeva. Their first child was born in November 2015. The pair divorced on June 7, 2017.

Career statistics

Regular season and playoffs

International

Awards and achievements

KHL
Trophies
 Gagarin Cup champion: 2011
 Continental Cup winner: 2009, 2010, 2015, 2016
 Golden Stick Award: 2010, 2011, 2012, 2015

AHL
Player of the week
 Week 2: 10 October 2006 to 15 October 2006

CHL
Player of the week
 Week 1: 1 November 2005
 Week 21: 21 March 2006

Trophies
 Memorial Cup: 2006
 Stafford Smythe Memorial Trophy: 2006
 CHL Top Scorer Award: 2006
 CHL Player of the Year: 2006

QMJHL

Player of the week
 Week 6: 24 to 30 October 2005
 Week 18: 23 to 29 January 2006
 Week 23: 27 February to 5 March 2006
 Week 25: 14 to 19 March 2006

Player of the month
 February 2006
 March 2006

Trophies
 Jean Béliveau Trophy: 2006
 Telus Trophy: 2006
 Michel Brière Memorial Trophy: 2006
 QMJHL First All-Star Team: 2006
 Coupe Postes Canada for QMJHL: 2006

References

External links
 
RussianProspects.com Alexander Radulov Profile

1986 births
Dallas Stars players
HC CSKA Moscow players
HC Dynamo Moscow players
Ice hockey players at the 2010 Winter Olympics
Ice hockey players at the 2014 Winter Olympics
Living people
Milwaukee Admirals players
Montreal Canadiens players
Nashville Predators draft picks
Nashville Predators players
National Hockey League first-round draft picks
Olympic ice hockey players of Russia
People from Nizhny Tagil
Quebec Remparts players
Russian expatriate ice hockey people
Russian ice hockey right wingers
Salavat Yulaev Ufa players
Sportspeople from Sverdlovsk Oblast